Horace Boies (December 7, 1827 – April 4, 1923) served as the 14th Governor of Iowa from 1890 to 1894 as a member of the United States Democratic Party. Boies was the only Democrat to serve in that position from 1855 to 1933, a period of 78 years.

Life before Iowa 
Horace was born in Aurora, New York and started his education in the public school system. In his late teens, he worked for four years as a farm laborer in the Wisconsin Territory. Moving back to New York, he studied law and was admitted to the bar in 1849, setting up practice in Hamburg, near Buffalo. He was elected to the New York State Assembly (Erie Co., 3rd D.) as a Republican in 1857.

Life in Iowa 
Horace moved to Waterloo, Iowa in 1867 and opened a law office. His career was successful, and he purchased large amounts of farmland in the area.

Boies left the Republican Party in 1880 due to their support of prohibition. He was elected governor of Iowa as a Democrat in 1889, breaking longtime Republican dominance of state politics. Reelected in 1891, he was defeated in 1893, by Frank D. Jackson, a Republican. He was a prominent populist and advocate of bimetallism, and during his term as governor proclaimed Iowa's first Labor Day holiday.

As governor, Boies gained sufficient prominence to become involved in national Democratic Party politics, though his campaigns for the presidential nomination at the 1892 and 1896 Democratic National Conventions were unsuccessful. His last political campaign, in 1902, was an unsuccessful attempt at the Democratic nomination for a Congressional seat from Iowa.

Following his retirement, Boies moved to Long Beach, California. This was a popular destination for Iowans at the time, and Boies was active in social events of his fellow Iowan transplants, participating in the Long Beach Iowa Reunion and serving as president of the Long Beach Iowa Association.

References

External links

HONORED BY IOWA DEMOCRATS article printed September 5, 1893 in the New York Times

Politicians from Waterloo, Iowa
People from Erie County, New York
Democratic Party members of the New York State Assembly
Democratic Party governors of Iowa
1827 births
1923 deaths
Iowa lawyers
New York (state) lawyers
Candidates in the 1892 United States presidential election
19th-century American lawyers
19th-century American politicians